Saltcoats is a town on the west coast of North Ayrshire, Scotland. The name is derived from the town's earliest industry when salt was harvested from the sea water of the Firth of Clyde, carried out in small cottages along the shore. It is part of the 'Three Towns' conurbation along with Ardrossan and Stevenston and is the third largest town in North Ayrshire.

History

In the late eighteenth century, several shipyards operated at Saltcoats, producing some sixty to seventy ships. The leading shipbuilder was William Ritchie, but in 1790 he moved his business to Belfast. By the early nineteenth century, the town had stopped producing ships. Saltcoats Town Hall, which dates back to 1826, is a Category B listed building.

In 2018, a statue to commemorate the popular footballer Bobby Lennox, from the town, was constructed across from the main station.

Governance
Saltcoats is part of the North Ayrshire and Arran constituency in the House of Commons and Cunninghame North constituency in the devolved Scottish Parliament. Both seats are held by the Scottish National Party.

Historically, Ardrossan has been part of the UK parliament constituencies North Ayrshire (1868–1918), Bute and Northern Ayrshire (1918–1983) and Cunninghame North (1983–2005). These constituencies historically returned Conservative or Unionist MPs until 1987, when the constituency was won by the Labour Party.

Transport
The harbour was designed by James Jardine in 1811, however no cargo or passenger services run from the harbour any more.

Saltcoats is served by regular bus and railway services. Primary bus services are provided by Stagecoach West Scotland, while rail services are operated by ScotRail. These rail services are frequent and serve nearby Glasgow, as well as Largs, Ardrossan and Kilwinning.

Although Saltcoats currently only has a single railway station, the town was once served by a second railway station located in the north of the town, originally as part of the Lanarkshire and Ayrshire Railway. This station ceased regular passenger services on 4 July 1932, and there is no trace of the station today bar a nearby bridge.

Notable people

 Alexander Allan (1780-1854), founder of the Allan Line Royal Mail Steamers
 Andrew Allan (1822-1901), of the Allan Line Royal Mail Steamers
 Sir Hugh Allan (1810-82), of the Allan Line Royal Mail Steamers
 George Biagi (b.1985), Italian national rugby player
 William Burns (1809-76), historian
 Kenneth Campbell (1917-1941), recipient of the Victoria Cross
 Steve Clarke (b.1963), professional footballer, Scotland national team manager
 Hamish Fraser (1913-1986), former communist, traditionalist Catholic writer and local councillor
 Janice Galloway (b.1955), author
 Michael Garrett (b.1964), first Sir Bernard Lovell chair in astrophysics, Director of Jodrell Bank Centre for Astrophysics
 Colin Hay (b.1953), musician, singer-songwriter, leader of Men at Work
 Al Howie (1945-2016), long-distance runner
 Bobby Lennox (b.1943), professional footballer
James Manson (1845-1935), engineer
 Hugh McMahon (1906-97), professional footballer
 Betsy Miller (1792-1864), sea captain
 Hugh Munro (1856-1919), mountaineer, author
 Graeme Obree (b.1965), cyclist
 Robert Thornton (b.1967), professional darts player

References

External links
Video footage and history of the old Saltcoats Harbour
Video footage of the 1678 Auchenharvie coalfield drain adit
Video footage and history of the old open air pools
The railway between Saltcoats and Stevenston

the3towns.com
Threetowners
SaltcoatsCommunityCouncil
Irvine Bay

Seaside resorts in Scotland
Towns in North Ayrshire
Firth of Clyde
Ardrossan−Saltcoats−Stevenston
Populated coastal places in Scotland